James McGrath may refer to:
J. Howard McGrath (1903–1966), sixtieth Governor of Rhode Island
James McGrath (Australian politician) (born 1974), Senator from Queensland
James McGrath (Canadian politician) (1932–2017), Lieutenant Governor of Newfoundland, Canada
James McGrath (Wisconsin politician) (1836–?), Wisconsin State Assemblyman
James Francis McGrath (1859–1902), fisherman and political figure in Newfoundland
James Frank McGrath, religion professor at Butler University in Indianapolis, USA
Jim McGrath (Australian commentator) (born c. 1952), Australian horse racing commentator, who works for the BBC
Jim McGrath (British commentator) (born 1955), British horse racing commentator, and Managing Director of Timeform
Jimmy McGrath (1907–?), English footballer
James M. McGrath (1902–1975), physician and politician in Newfoundland
James McGrath (artist) (born 1969), Australian artist and architect
James McGrath (referee) (born 1977), Irish hurling referee